The world's busiest airports by passenger traffic are measured by total passengers (data from Airports Council International), defined as passengers enplaned plus passengers deplaned plus direct-transit passengers. Hartsfield–Jackson Atlanta International Airport has been the world's busiest airport every year since 2000; with all airports combined London has the world's busiest city airport system by passenger count. As of 2016, seven countries have at least two airports in the top 50; the United States of America has 16, China has 8 (including Hong Kong), and the United Kingdom, Japan, Germany, India and Spain have two airports each.

2009 statistics
Airports Council International's final full year figures are as follows:

2008 statistics
Airports Council International's final full year figures are as follows:

2007 statistics
Airports Council International's final full year figures are as follows:

2006 statistics
Airports Council International's final full year figures are as follows:

Notes
 Includes figures for Bangkok International Airport from 1 January 2006 to 27 September 2006.

2005 statistics
Airports Council International's final full year figures are as follows:

2004 statistics
Airports Council International's final full year figures are as follows:

2003 statistics
Airports Council International's final full year figures are as follows:

2002 statistics
Airports Council International's final full year figures are as follows:

2001 statistics
Airports Council International's final full year figures are as follows:

2000 statistics
Airports Council International's final full year figures are as follows:

See also

 List of busiest airports by international passenger traffic
 List of busiest airports by cargo traffic
 List of busiest airports by aircraft movements
 List of the busiest airports in the United States
 List of the busiest airports in Europe

References

External links
 Airports Council International Statistics and Data Centre

Busiest airports by passenger traffic
 Passenger traffic 2000-2009